The president of Hirshabelle is the executive head of state of Hirshabelle, a federated state of the Federal Republic of Somalia, and is elected by the Hirshabelle legislature to serve an indeterminate term.

List

See also 
List of presidents of Jubaland
List of presidents of Puntland
Lists of office-holders

References

Hirshabelle
Somalia history-related lists
Government of Somalia